Aleksandr Andreyevich Tikhomirov (– October 23, 1931) was a Russian zoologist. After graduating in the Saint Petersburg University and the Moscow University, Tikhomirov became a Professor of the latter and the director of the zoological museum attached to it. 

His major works, containing anti-darwinism, concern the anatomy, embryology and the physiology of silkworm. In 1886 Tikhomirov discovered the artificial parthenogenesis on the silkworm's grain.

References
Content of this page derives from the Great Soviet Encyclopedia article on the same subject.

1850 births
1931 deaths
Saint Petersburg State University alumni
Moscow State University alumni
19th-century zoologists from the Russian Empire
Rectors of Moscow State University
20th-century Russian zoologists